Chris Enahoro (born 7 April 1983) is an Australian former rugby league footballer who played in the 2000s. He played for the South Sydney Rabbitohs.

Playing career
Enahoro as a youngster played in the South Sydney Juniors competition for Coogee Randwick Wombats. He made his first grade debut in his side's 62−22 loss to the Canberra Raiders at Bruce Stadium in round 26 of the 2004 season. Enahoro's only other first grade appearance came in his side's 36−12 loss to the Brisbane Broncos at Lang Park in round 12 of the 2005 season. He signed to play with the Gold Coast Titans for the 2007 season, but did not make any first grade appearances for the club.

References

1983 births
Living people
Australian rugby league players
Rugby league centres
Rugby league players from Brisbane
South Sydney Rabbitohs players